Kenneth Robert Buck (born February 16, 1959) is an American lawyer and politician who has represented Colorado's 4th congressional district in the United States House of Representatives since 2015. From March 30, 2019, to March 27, 2021, Buck served as chair of the Colorado Republican Party, having replaced Jeff Hays.

Formerly the District Attorney for Weld County, Colorado, Buck ran unsuccessfully for U.S. Senate in 2010, narrowly losing to Democrat Michael Bennet. In Congress, Buck has emerged as one of the foremost proponents of antitrust enforcement in the Republican Party.

Early life and education
Buck was born in Ossining, New York, in 1959. He and his two brothers were encouraged by their parents, Ruth (Larsen) and James Buck, both New York lawyers, to attend Ivy League colleges. Buck earned a Bachelor of Arts degree in politics from Princeton University in 1981 and completed a 75-page long senior thesis titled "Saudi Arabia: Caught Between a Rock and a Hard Place". Buck later said that the Princeton degree was "more important to [my father] than me".

At Princeton, Buck played four years of football on the Princeton Tigers football team, including one year as a defensive back/punter/kicker and three years as a punter, earning All-Ivy League honors as a punter his senior year. After college, he worked in Wyoming at the state legislative services office and received a Juris Doctor from the University of Wyoming College of Law in 1985. He was also an instructor at the University of Denver Law School and for the National Institute for Trial Advocacy in Colorado.

Career

U.S. Attorney's Office
In 1986, Buck was hired by Congressman Dick Cheney to work on the Iran–Contra investigation. Following that assignment, he worked as a prosecutor with the U.S. Department of Justice in Washington D.C.

In 1990, Buck joined the United States Attorney's Office for the District of Colorado, where he became Chief of the Criminal Division. Buck was formally reprimanded and required to take ethics classes in 2001 for a meeting he had with defense attorneys about a felony case he thought should not be pursued. Only one of the three men initially indicted on felony charges was convicted, for a misdemeanor offense. Buck said he is "not proud" of the incident that effectively ended his career with the Justice Department, but that he felt it was unethical to prosecute such a "weak" case. One of the three men donated $700 to Buck's 2010 Senate campaign.

Weld County District Attorney
Buck was elected the District Attorney for Weld County, Colorado, in 2004. When he suspected that Social Security numbers were being stolen by undocumented immigrants, he raided a tax service in Greeley, Colorado, and seized more than 5,000 tax files. The American Civil Liberties Union sued Buck's office for violating the privacy of the service's clients and after an appeal to the Colorado Supreme Court, costing the county approximately $150,000, the raid was deemed unconstitutional. Buck has said that his time enforcing laws for the Justice Department and Weld County stoked his desire to become a lawmaker himself.

Rape case controversy
During the 2010 Senate race, The Colorado Independent ran an article titled "Suspect in 2005 Buck rape case said he knew it was rape". The article, about a case Buck refused to prosecute in 2006, included a complete transcript of a tape between the victim and her attacker, including the following dialogue:
Victim: "You do realize that … it’s rape."
Suspect: "Yeah, I do."
Victim: "Like in a number of different ways, because I didn’t want to do it and because I was intoxicated and because I was afraid."
Suspect: "Yes I do. I know."
The tape, which Greeley police had the victim record during its investigation, was available before Buck made his decision not to prosecute the woman's admitted rapist.

According to a following article in the Independent, "Buck’s refusal to prosecute 2005 rape case reverberates in U.S. Senate race," the reporter provides a transcript of another tape of a conversation between the woman and Buck, in which "Buck appears to all but blame her for the rape and tells her that her case would never fly with a Weld County jury." "A jury could very well conclude that this is a case of buyer’s remorse," Buck told the Greeley Tribune in 2006. "That comment made me feel horrible," the victim told the Colorado Independent in 2010. "The offender admitted he did it, but Ken Buck said I was to blame. Had he [Buck] not attacked me, I might have let it go. But he put the blame on me, and I was furious. I still am furious", she said. According to the Independent, "A man entered the alleged victim’s apartment and had sex with her while she was drunk, she says. As she passed in and out of consciousness, she says she told him 'no' and tried to push him away. If he had been a stranger, the case may have played out differently, but he was a former lover, and she had invited him over." In the meeting that she recorded, Buck said, "It appears to me … that you invited him over to have sex with him," and that he thought she might have wanted to file rape charges to retaliate against the man for some bad feeling left over from when they had been lovers more than a year earlier. According to the Independent, "Buck also comes off on this tape as being at least as concerned with the woman’s sexual history and alcohol consumption as he is with other facts of the case." Drawing on Buck's abortion stance, the Independent wrote, "The suspect in this case had claimed that the victim had at one point a year or so before this event become pregnant with his child and had an abortion, which she denies, saying she miscarried. The suspect's claim, though, is in the police report, and Buck refers to it as a reason she may be motivated to file charges where he thinks none are warranted."

Attempted falsification of Colorado Assembly GOP primary 
On May 6, 2020, The Denver Post published a recording of a conference call between Buck and local Republican party official Eli Bremer, who confirmed the authenticity of the recording.

In the recording, Buck first asked Bremer if he understood "the order of the executive committee and the central committee" to put activist David Stiver "on the ballot" in the November 2020 election for the District 10 state senate seat. Stiver had not qualified for the November ballot because he only received 24% of votes from Republicans in the district, short of the 30% qualifying mark. Bremer replied: "Uh, yes, sir, I understand the central committee has adopted a resolution that requires me to sign a false affidavit to the state". Buck continued: "And will you do so?" Bremer replied: "I will seek legal counsel as I am being asked to sign an affidavit that states Mr. Stiver received 30% of the vote. I need to seek legal counsel to find out if I am putting myself in jeopardy of a misdemeanor for doing that." Buck lastly asked: "And you understand that it is the order of the central committee that you do so?", to which Bremer replied he understood, and reiterated he would seek legal advice.

Buck told The Denver Post on May 6 that Colorado political party committees traditionally made such decisions. The primary between Stiver and his opponent had been unfair due to the impact of the COVID-19 pandemic in Colorado, Buck said. He further claimed he was not asking Bremer "to commit fraud", but asking "if he understood the decision of the central committee and if he was willing to follow the request of the Republican central committee". Buck also said he had no "personal stake in the process". Meanwhile, Bremer decried that the Republican Party he belonged to was "for the rule of law except when it applies to us".

2010 U.S. Senate campaign

Republican primary

Angered by what he later called the nation's "lurch to the left," Buck announced his candidacy for U.S. Senate on April 28, 2009. In his first run for statewide office, Buck frequently referenced national issues in defining his goals as a U.S. senator. Among these were his opposition to the Patient Protection and Affordable Care Act, the Troubled Asset Relief Program (a program of federal economic stimulus initiated under President George W. Bush and finalized under President Barack Obama) and the role of federal policy czars. Buck also stressed mounting governmental debt, an issue to which he frequently returned during the primary campaign. Contrasting himself to what he argued was the "top down" style of early Republican favorite Lieutenant Governor Jane Norton, Buck pledged a "bottom-up" campaign that would include visits to each of Colorado's 64 counties. 

Initially Norton was seen to have had a nearly insurmountable advantage against "a band of underfunded unknowns" that included Buck, who early in the primary season was called "a dead-in-the-water Republican U.S. Senate candidate with laughable fundraising totals and little establishment GOP support". Norton's staff at the beginning of the campaign was twice the size of Buck's. He attempted to make a virtue of his meager war chest by positioning "himself as the small-money underdog" in an election cycle that saw a "populist push for outsider candidates to upset the Washington establishment".

After receiving nearly $600,000 in a television advertising support from Americans for Job Security and a victory in March at the state party's caucuses, Buck began to receive endorsements and notice. By late spring of 2010, Colorado had highly competitive Republican and Democratic primaries.

Although Buck positioned himself as the candidate for the Tea Party movement during the Republican primary, he stirred controversy at times with remarks critical of former Representative Tom Tancredo, a Tea Party favorite, and the statement "Will you tell those dumbasses at the Tea Party to stop asking questions about birth certificates while I'm on the camera?"—a reference to those suspicious of President Barack Obama's place of birth. Buck blamed the comments on his exhaustion and frustration after months of campaigning, and on his exasperation that it was difficult to keep debate focused on the mounting governmental debt. Tea Party leader Lu Busse criticized Buck's "choice of words" and inclination to treat all Tea Party adherents as a uniform group.

Buck again stirred controversy by suggesting voters should cast their votes for him over Norton because, unlike Norton, "I do not wear high heels." Buck later said he was responding to Norton's television ad claiming he was not "man enough" to attack her himself. (According to a mass email sent on behalf of Senator Jim DeMint, it was a joking paraphrase of his opponent's suggestion to vote for her "because I wear high heels").

Making reference to Buck's mandatory ethics classes, Norton argued that she "didn't need an ethics class to know what's right. ... Ken broke the rules, and the facts speak for themselves." After Buck's former supervisor, then-U.S. Attorney John Suthers, endorsed Norton, the Colorado Democratic Party Chair called for Buck's resignation from his Weld County post because of his "career bypassing justice and ethics to reward political allies and campaign contributors".

On August 10, Buck defeated Norton in the Republican primary, 52% to 48%, the end of "a bitterly contested primary that saw him go from an obscure and cash-starved underdog to a gaffe-prone mascot for anti-establishment conservatives [in Colorado] and nationally."

Senate general election
In the November 2010 general election, Buck lost to appointed Senator Michael Bennet, 48.1% to 46.4%.

U.S. House of Representatives

Elections

2014 

On August 19, 2013, Buck emailed supporters and announced that the lymphoma he had been diagnosed with was in remission following treatment and he would run against Senator Mark Udall in 2014. He had already filed to run on August 7, 2013, before he sent out the email. In March 2014, Buck withdrew from the race following the entrance of Cory Gardner and decided instead to run for Gardner's seat in Colorado's 4th congressional district.

Buck won the Republican primary, defeating three other candidates with 44% of the vote. He defeated Democratic nominee Vic Meyers in the general election with 65% of the vote.

2016 

Buck ran for reelection unopposed in the Republican primary. He defeated Democratic nominee Bob Seay in the general election with 63.5% of the vote.

2018 

Buck ran for reelection unopposed in the Republican primary. He defeated Democratic nominee Karen McCormick in the general election with 60.6% of the vote.

2020 

Buck ran for reelection unopposed in the Republican primary. He defeated Democratic nominee Ike McCorkle in the general election with 60.1% of the vote.

2022 

Buck won the Republican primary, defeating Robert Lewis. He defeated Democratic nominee Ike McCorkle a second time in the general election with 60.9% of the vote.

Tenure

Taxation 
Buck voted in favor of the Tax Cuts and Jobs Act of 2017. He said the bill is "fairer for American families" and that it would "keep more jobs in America."

Pandemic response 
On March 4, 2020, Buck was one of only two representatives to vote against an $8.3 billion emergency aid package meant to help the United States respond to the COVID-19 pandemic. He subsequently voted against the March 14, 2020 Coronavirus Relief Bill that passed the House by a vote of 363–40.

While vaccines were approved for use to prevent the coronavirus and being distributed, Buck told Fox News he would refuse inoculation: "I will not be taking the vaccine. I'm an American. I have the freedom to decide if I'm going to take a vaccine or not and in this case I am not going to take the vaccine. I'm more concerned about the safety of the vaccine than I am the side effects of the disease."

2020 election dispute
In December 2020, Buck signed onto the lawsuit seeking to overturn the result of the 2020 election.

Committee assignments
Committee on the Judiciary
Subcommittee on Immigration and Citizenship
Subcommittee on Antitrust, Commercial and Administrative Law
Committee on Foreign Affairs
Subcommittee on Oversight and Investigations
Subcommittee on Western Hemisphere, Civilian Security, and Trade

Caucus memberships
 Congressional Western Caucus
Freedom Caucus
Republican Study Committee
Second Amendment Caucus
 Freedom from Big Tech Caucus

Political positions

2020 presidential election
In December 2020, Buck was one of 126 Republican members of the House of Representatives to sign an amicus brief in support of Texas v. Pennsylvania, a lawsuit filed at the United States Supreme Court contesting the results of the 2020 presidential election, in which Joe Biden defeated incumbent Donald Trump. The Supreme Court declined to hear the case on the basis that Texas lacked standing under Article III of the Constitution to challenge the results of an election held by another state.

Buck later became one of a group of seven Republicans who did not support their colleagues' efforts to challenge the results of the election on January 6, 2021. These seven signed a letter that, while giving credence to election fraud allegations Trump made, said Congress did not have the authority to influence the election's outcome.

Abortion 
Buck opposes abortion, including in cases of rape and incest, but makes exceptions if the mother's life is in danger.

Antitrust 
Buck favors bipartisan legislation designed to bolster the federal government's ability to bring antitrust cases against "Big Tech" companies. In 2021, he introduced the House version of the Open App Markets Act alongside Democrat Hank Johnson. Buck supports the proposed American Innovation and Choice Online Act.

In 2022, Buck was one of 39 Republicans to vote for the Merger Filing Fee Modernization Act of 2022, an antitrust package that would crack down on corporations for anti-competitive behavior.

COVID-19 
Buck opposed many of Colorado's COVID-19 restrictions, including the closing of businesses. Of COVID-19 restrictions, he told The Denver Post, "we went like lambs to the slaughter. We can't allow that to happen again". Buck voted against the American Rescue Plan Act of 2021, calling it "funding for pet projects in Nancy Pelosi and Chuck Schumer's home states, money for Obamacare subsidies and Planned Parenthood, and stimulus checks for prisoners and illegal immigrants".

Education 
Buck supports a revamp of the Department of Education and questions the department's constitutionality.

Environment 
Buck rejects the scientific consensus on climate change. In an October 2010 meeting with supporters in Fort Collins, Colorado, he endorsed the views of Senator James Inhofe, saying, "Inhofe was the first person to stand up and say this global warming is the greatest hoax that has been perpetrated. The evidence just keeps supporting his view, and more and more people's view, of what's going on." According to a Buck spokesman, "Ken believes there is global warming but thinks the evidence points to it being natural rather than man-made."

Foreign policy 
In 2020, Buck voted against the National Defense Authorization Act of 2021, which would prevent the president from withdrawing soldiers from Afghanistan without congressional approval.

In 2021, during a House vote on a measure condemning the Myanmar coup d'état that overwhelmingly passed, Buck was among 14 Republican representatives who voted against it, for reasons reported to be unclear.

In June 2021, Buck was one of 49 House Republicans to vote to repeal the AUMF against Iraq.

In September 2021, Buck was among 75 House Republicans to vote against the National Defense Authorization Act of 2022, which contains a provision that would require women to be drafted.

Buck was among 19 House Republicans to vote against the final passage of the 2022 National Defense Authorization Act.

In 2023, Buck was among 47 Republicans to vote in favor of H.Con.Res. 21 which directed President Joe Biden to remove U.S. troops from Syria within 180 days.

Guns 
Buck opposes gun control and is endorsed by Gun Owners of America. He has said he would "oppose any federal legislation to compile a database of gun owners or to further proscribe Americans' freedoms under the Second Amendment".

Healthcare 
He opposes the health care reform laws enacted in 2010. He instead favors free market-based reforms. His campaign website states, "We need to let the market work, make people responsible for their own insurance, and restore Americans' freedom to decide for themselves whether and how much insurance to buy." He supported a state constitutional amendment that would give rights to unborn fetuses, but then later withdrew his support reportedly after he found out that the measure would have restricted certain fertility and contraception procedures.

LGBT rights 
Buck supported the U.S. military's "Don't ask, don't tell" policy. He said, "I do not support the repeal of don't ask don't tell. I think it is a policy that makes a lot of sense." Buck believes that being gay is a choice. He said, "I think birth has an influence over it, like alcoholism ... but I think that basically you have a choice." The Log Cabin Republicans have rebuked him for this comment. In 2015, Buck condemned the Supreme Court decision Obergefell v. Hodges, which held that same-sex marriage bans violate the constitution. On June 19, 2022, Buck voted against The Respect for Marriage Act, a bill that would protect the right to gay marriage at a federal level.

In 2021 Buck opposed the Equality Act, arguing that the legislation would force doctors to treat LGBT patients despite their religious objections, comparing it to forcing Jewish doctors to treat Nazi patients.

Net neutrality 
Buck signed his support for Ajit Pai's motion to abolish net neutrality, alongside 106 other Republican representatives. When asked about Pai's work to unravel net neutrality rules, Buck said: "I support Chairman Pai's efforts to free internet providers from burdensome regulations that stifle innovation and increase costs for Coloradans."

National security 
During debate over the USA FREEDOM Reauthorization Act of 2020, Buck offered an amendment to the title of the bill so as to read: "A bill to be known as the Federal Initiative to Spy on Americans (FISA) Act." With only 35 votes in favor, the amendment was not adopted.

Veterans' health 
Buck proposed privatizing Veterans Administration hospitals so they would "be better run". Three months later, he changed positions and his campaign said, "while Buck does indeed believe that private sector providers might do a better job than the VA in delivering health care to veterans, he is not in favor of fully privatizing health care for veterans."

Personal life
Both of Buck's marriages ended in divorce. Buck has two children from his first marriage. His son Cody (born 1988) is a 2011 graduate of the U.S. Military Academy at West Point, New York. Buck and his second wife, Perry, announced their divorce on November 9, 2018, three days after the midterm election.

Buck engages in a series of personal boycotts, avoiding purchases that benefit American car companies that took federal bailout money, Nike for supporting Colin Kaepernick, and large tech companies like Facebook, Apple, Amazon, and Google for their approach to competitors, privacy, censorship, and working with the Chinese government.

Books 
Buck's book Drain the Swamp: How Washington Corruption is Worse Than You Think was published in 2017. His book Crushed: Big Tech's War on Free Speech was published in 2023.

References

External links

 Congressman Ken Buck official U.S. House website
 Ken Buck for Congress official campaign website
 
 
 
 Campaign contributions at OpenSecrets.org.
 Collected news and commentary at The Washington Times.
 Political Polygraph: A fact check on Ken Buck, Elizabeth Miller, The Denver Post, August 14, 2010.

1959 births
21st-century American politicians
Candidates in the 2010 United States elections
Colorado Republican Party chairs
District attorneys in Colorado
Living people
People from Greeley, Colorado
People from Ossining, New York
Princeton University alumni
Republican Party members of the United States House of Representatives from Colorado
Tea Party movement activists
University of Wyoming College of Law alumni